Polina Yuryevna Mikhaylova (born 31 August 1986) is a Russian table tennis player. She competed at the 2016 Summer Olympics in the women's singles event, in which she was eliminated in the second round by Viktoria Pavlovich.

References

1986 births
Living people
Russian female table tennis players
Olympic table tennis players of Russia
Table tennis players at the 2016 Summer Olympics
Universiade medalists in table tennis
Universiade silver medalists for Russia
European Games competitors for Russia
Table tennis players at the 2015 European Games
Table tennis players at the 2019 European Games
Table tennis players at the 2020 Summer Olympics
20th-century Russian women
21st-century Russian women